The following is a list of the Dead Sea Scrolls from the cave 1 near  Qumran.

Description
Wadi Qumran Cave 1 was discovered for the first time in 1946. The initial discovery, by Bedouin shepherd Muhammed edh-Dhib, his cousin Jum'a Muhammed, and Khalil Musa, took place between November 1946 and February 1947. The shepherds discovered seven scrolls housed in jars in a cave near what is now known as the Qumran site and took them back to the camp to show to his family. None of the scrolls were destroyed in this process. The original seven Dead Sea Scrolls from Cave 1 at Qumran are the Great Isaiah Scroll (1QIsaa), a second copy of Isaiah (1QIsab), the Community Rule Scroll (1QS), the Pesher on Habakkuk (1QpHab), the War Scroll (1QM), the Thanksgiving Hymns (1QH), and the Genesis Apocryphon (1QapGen). One of the pottery jars containing the scrolls from Cave 1 is now kept in the British Museum.

List of manuscripts
Some resources for more complete information on the Dead Sea Scrolls are the book by Emanuel Tov, "Revised Lists of the Texts from the Judaean Desert" for a complete list of all of the Dead Sea Scroll texts, as well as the online webpages for the Shrine of the Book and the Leon Levy Collection, both of which present photographs and images of the scrolls and fragments themselves for closer study. Information is not always comprehensive, as content for many scrolls has not yet been fully published.

Gallery

See also 
 Biblical manuscripts
 Septuagint manuscripts
 List of Hebrew Bible manuscripts

References

Bibliography

External links
 A Catalog of Biblical Passages in the Dead Sea Scrolls by David Washburn, 2002
 Textual Criticism: Recovering the Text of the Hebrew Bible by Peter Kyle McCarter, 1986

Dead Sea Scrolls
Qumran Cave 1